Nights on the Nile is a 1949 West German musical comedy film directed by Arthur Maria Rabenalt and starring Sonja Ziemann, Wolfgang Lukschy and Kurt Seifert. It was shot at the Tempelhof Studios in West Berlin and on location around the city including along the River Havel. The film's sets were designed by the art director Emil Hasler and Walter Kutz.

Cast

References

Bibliography

External links 
 

1949 films
1949 musical comedy films
German musical comedy films
West German films
1940s German-language films
Films directed by Arthur Maria Rabenalt
Films about filmmaking
Films set in 1912
German black-and-white films
1940s German films
Films shot in Berlin
Films shot at Tempelhof Studios